This is a list of the 89 currently operating suburban railway stations in Adelaide, South Australia, in addition to active proposals. The stations comprise six railway lines, of which two are branch lines.

Stations

See also

List of closed Adelaide railway stations
List of suburban and commuter rail systems
Railways in Adelaide
Rail transport in South Australia

References

External links
 Adelaide Metro

 01
Railway stations
Railway stations, Adelaide
Adelaide
.Rail
Adelaide